Boombox was a Breakbeat and Old Skool radio channel on Sirius Satellite Radio created and programmed by DJ Liquid Todd. Notable shows on the channel included "Automatic Static" with DJ Icey on Friday nights, an old-school lunchtime show with DJ Red Alert, the "Flash Mash" with DJ Grandmaster Flash and "The Liquid Todd Show" with DJ Liquid Todd which aired weekday afternoons.

The channel was canceled when Sirius Satellite Radio and XM Satellite Radio merged in 2008. Currently Liquid Todd hosts a two-hour speciality show with a similar format called "Boombox Radio" on the Sirius XM channel Alt Nation. This show stopped airing on Alt Nation as of September 2015.

See also
 List of Sirius Satellite Radio stations

References

External links
 DJ Icey
 DJ Red Alert 
 Grand Master Flash
 Liquid Todd
 SiriusXM

Defunct radio stations in the United States
Radio stations established in 2002
Radio stations disestablished in 2008